The United Patternmakers Association (UPA) was a trade union in the United Kingdom.

History
The association was founded in 1872 to represent skilled patternmakers in England, following a strike by patternmakers along the River Tyne and River Wear for a nine-hour day.  Originally based in London, it transferred its headquarters to Manchester in 1896, to Leeds in 1903, then to Eccles in 1908, returning to London in 1912.

The Associated Patternmakers of Scotland union merged into the UPA in 1912.  In 1918, the union balloted its members on joining the new Amalgamated Engineering Union, but this was not approved.

During the 1930s, George Buchanan was the union's president, and the union focussed considerable attention on anti-fascist activity.  It was initially sympathetic to the Independent Labour Party's split from the Labour Party, although by 1935 Buchanan's union backing was withdrawn.  It retained a strong craft unionist approach, and resisted the prevailing trend of admitting workers in allied trades.

In 1969, the union renamed itself the Association of Patternmakers and Allied Craftsmen.  By 1979, its membership stood just under 10,000, mostly in the English Midlands.  Only three members were women.  In 1984, it merged into the Technical, Administrative and Supervisory Section.

Election results
The union sponsored candidates in numerous Parliamentary elections between 1909 and 1974, most of whom were elected.  Almost all ran as Labour Party candidates, the exception being Buchanan in 1931 who was refused Labour Party endorsement, and instead stood for the Independent Labour Party.  He ran for that party again in 1935, on this occasion without official backing from the union, although it did set up a voluntary fund for his support, to which members could choose to donate.  By 1945, he had returned to the Labour Party.

Officials

General Secretaries
1872: R. C. Douglas
1872: R. Reay
1884: William Mosses
1917: Alan Findlay
1941: Wilfred Beard
1967: Samuel McLaren
1969: Gerry Eastwood

Presidents
1872: N. Charlton
1876: C. Mothersdale
1880: S. T. Taylor
1884: R. Brown
1884: T. Souter
1885: John Livingston
1888: George E. Wilson
1891: Thomas Goodall
1892: Joseph W. Field
1893: Joseph Taylor
1894: William Williams
1895: Fred W. Kent
1896: John Mills
1897: Ed Appleby
1899: J. M. Whittaker
1900: Thomas Battison
1901: J. M. Whittaker
1902: A. Mackenzie
1903: Arthur Pearson
1909: John Mills
1913: Albert E. Wardale
1932: George Buchanan
1946: Ellis Smith
1966: Victor MacDonald
1977:

References

External links
Catalogue of the UPA archives, held at the Modern Records Centre, University of Warwick

 
1872 establishments in the United Kingdom
Engineering trade unions
Defunct trade unions of the United Kingdom
Trade unions established in 1872
Trade unions disestablished in 1984
Patternmakers (industrial)
Craft unions
Trade unions based in London